QC Anime-zing! is an anime convention organized in the Quad Cities, United States. The convention offers anime screenings, video games, a dealers room, guest panels, fan panels, cosplay competitions, and many other events typical of an anime convention. It was first held at The Lodge Hotel in Bettendorf, IA from June 18–20, 2010. Guests for the 2010 convention were Johnny Yong Bosch, Robert Axelrod, Spike Spencer, Eyeshine, and The Man Power. The 2011 convention will be held June 17–19, 2011 at The RiverCenter in Davenport, Iowa.

Programming
QC Anime-zing! runs for three days, including events happening throughout the weekend.
 Anime Screenings - The convention will be showing anime series in screening rooms.
 Artist's Alley - Artists have the opportunity to sell or display their artwork.
 ConSuite - A hospitality suite with free rice, ramen, and other snack foods.
 Cosplay Contest - Visitors can compete to see whose costume is the best.
 Dealer's Room - Outside vendors sell their products, including mostly video game or anime-related goods and Japanese snack food.
 Guests of Honor - Voice actors and musicians will be appearing and performing, giving autographs and interacting with fans.
 Rave - An official dance that will last late into Saturday night.
 Video Games - There will be video games and tournaments organized throughout the weekend.

History

Event history

Anime-Zap!
QC Anime-zing! is particularly known for organizing an 'instant' anime convention after a small nearby convention, Pokettokon, had been cancelled less than a week prior to the convention weekend. The instant event gathered 160 attendees with less than 72 hours of planning.

Event history

Anime-Spark!
QC Anime-zing! recently announced another second anime convention, Anime-SPARK!, to be held in Cedar Rapids, Iowa on Valentine's Day weekend.

Event history

References

External links
 
 Anime-Zap! Website
 Anime-Spark! Website

Recurring events established in 2010
2010 establishments in Iowa
Anime conventions in the United States
Annual events in the United States
Culture of Cedar Rapids, Iowa
Culture of the Quad Cities
East Peoria, Illinois
Festivals in Iowa
Tourist attractions in the Quad Cities
Tourist attractions in Davenport, Iowa
Tourist attractions in Cedar Rapids, Iowa
Tourist attractions in Peoria, Illinois
Tourist attractions in Tazewell County, Illinois
Conventions in Iowa